Al Moore may refer to:

 A. L. Moore (1849–1939) British glass-maker
 A. Al Moore (1915–1991), American football player
 Albert Moore (disambiguation), several persons